Qarasaqqal (also, Karasakkal) is a village and municipality in the Kurdamir Rayon of Azerbaijan.

References 

Populated places in Kurdamir District